N'Gara is a village and rural commune in the Cercle of Ségou in the Ségou Region of southern-central Mali. The commune includes three villages in an area of approximately 159 square kilometers. In the 2009 census it had a population of 11,700. The village of N'Gara, the chef-lieu of the commune, is 30 km southwest of Ségou.

References

External links
.

Communes of Ségou Region